Sharon Emily Cameron is a Canadian politician and former civil servant, who has been serving as the leader of the Prince Edward Island Liberal Party since November 19, 2022.

Prior to her work in government, Cameron worked as an intermediate school principal in Charlottetown, Prince Edward Island.

In 2010, Cameron was appointed deputy minister of social services and aeniors in the government of Robert Ghiz, and in 2015 she was appointed deputy minister of workforce and advanced learning by Ghiz's successor, Wade MacLauchlan. Additionally, she served as CEO of the Workers Compensation Board and as an advisor to MacLauchlan on social policy. On September 22, 2022, following MacLauchlan's defeat in the 2019 election and subsequent resignation as Liberal leader, she announced her campaign to replace him. As the only candidate in the race by the close of nominations on October 2, the party announced on October 7 that Cameron would be arecclaimed as leader at the convention on November 19. Cameron had previously sought the Liberal nomination in Cornwall-Meadowbank ahead of the riding's 2021 by-election, losing to Jane MacIsaac.

References

Living people
People from Amherst, Nova Scotia
21st-century Canadian politicians
21st-century Canadian women politicians
Year of birth missing (living people)
Prince Edward Island Liberal Party leaders
Female Canadian political party leaders